The Blue Bedroom, published in 1985, was Rosamunde Pilcher's first collection of short stories. There are 13 stories, including the title story. The book has a preface by Lee Quarfoot, who was then fiction editor of Good Housekeeping Magazine.

The Stories 
There are 13 stories:
 "Toby"
 "Home for the Day"
 "Spanish Ladies"
 "Miss Cameron at Christmas"
 "Tea with the Professor"
 "Amita"
 "The Blue Bedroom"
 "Gilbert
 "The Before-Christmas Present"
 "The White Birds"
 "The Tree"
 "The House on the Hill"
 "An Evening to Remember"

Editions 
An audiobook was created from the collection called The White Birds and other stories. It was read by Lynn Redgrave.

1983 short story collections
British short story collections